Portugal has a modern and flexible telecommunications market and a wide range of varied media organisations. The regulatory body overseeing communications is called ANACOM.

The country has one of the highest mobile phone penetration rates in the world (the number of operative mobile phones already exceeds the population). This network also provides wireless mobile Internet connections as well, and covers the entire territory. As of October 2006, 36.8% of households had high-speed Internet services and 78% of companies had Internet access. Most Portuguese watch television through cable (June 2004: 73.6% of households). Paid Internet connections are available at many cafés, as well as many post offices. One can also surf on the Internet at hotels, conference centres and shopping centres, where special areas are reserved for this purpose. Free Internet access is also available to Portuguese residents at "Espaços de Internet" across the country.

Broadband overview
Portugal has a mid-sized but advanced telecoms market, with a steadily growing broadband subscriber base well served by cable, DSL and the emerging FTTx platforms. Mobile penetration is far above the European Union average, while the development of digital TV services has progressed under cautious regulatory guidance. The progressive liberalisation of the Portuguese market began at the beginning of the 1990s through the creation of the Portuguese Institute for Communications (ICP). Through a combination of specific deadlines for liberalisation and entry mechanisms for new market players, Portugal's telecoms scene was successfully opened up to competition.
The country's broadband market showed accelerated growth in 2010 not least due to its widespread cable and DSL networks, but also due to aggressive fibre deployment. Broadband services with up to 100 Mbit/s, 200 Mbit/s and even 1 Gbit/s speeds were launched in 2009. The country's leading telecom operators have partnered up to build high speed next generation networks.
The government's broadband initiative for 2009-2010 had the following two aims: (i) the connection of up to 1.5 million homes and businesses to the new fibre networks enabling them to benefit from improvements in high-speed Internet, TV and voice services; (ii) the achievement of 50 per cent broadband penetration among households by 2010. Both aims were reached.
At the end of 2010, the number of households connected to the fibre-optic networks (FTTH/B) by all operators stood at 1.47 million. The number of households with accesses using the EuroDOCSIS 3.0 standard totalled 3.8 million. It is estimated that about 59 per cent of family households now have access to at least one high-speed network. High-speed accesses are concentrated in the Lisbon and North regions of the country.
(sourced from open-topic.com)

Telephones - main lines in use:
5.179million (2019)

Telephones - mobile cellular:
12.028million (2019)
Cell Networks(2G/3G/3.5G/4G):
MEO -  (2G to 4G licence) ; UZO (Virtual Carrier, owned by MEO) ; Moche (Virtual Carrier, runs under MEO prefix) ;
Vodafone (2G to 4G licence) ; Yorn (Virtual Carrier, runs under Vodafone prefix) ;
NOS (2G to 4G licence) ; WTF (Virtual Carrier, runs under NOS prefix) ; Phone-ix (Virtual carrier owned by CTT and operated by the MEO network) and Continente Mobile (operated by Optimus and hypermarket chain, Continente).

Telephone system:
general assessment:
Portugal's telephone system has achieved a state-of-the-art network with broadband, high-speed capabilities and a main line telephone density of 53%
domestic:
integrated network of coaxial cables, open-wire, microwave radio relay, and domestic satellite earth stations
international:
6 submarine cables; satellite earth stations - 3 Intelsat (2 Atlantic Ocean and 1 Indian Ocean), NA Eutelsat; tropospheric scatter to Azores; note - an earth station for Inmarsat (Atlantic Ocean region) is planned

Radio 
Radio broadcast stations:
AM 47, FM 172 (many are repeaters), shortwave 2 (1998)

Radios:
3.02 million (1997)

Television 
Television broadcast stations:
36 (plus 62 repeaters) (1997)

Televisions:
3.31 million (1997)

Free-to-air television networks:

Rádio e Televisão de Portugal:
RTP1
RTP2
RTP3
RTP Memória

Free-to-air national coverage stations:
SIC
TVI

Regional Stations:
Porto Canal
RTP Açores
RTP Madeira

International:

RTPi (sat/cable)
RTP África (sat/cable/on-air)
SIC Internacional (sat/cable)

Analog TV system:
PAL (625 line, 50 Hz.)
Digital TV system:
DVB-T (MPEG4 for SD and HD broadcasts.)

NOTE: Most TV Networks/stations have specific interactive TV(cable) oriented services.

Internet 

Internet Users: 7.73million (2018)

Internet Hosts:
1.858million (2007)

Internet Service Providers (ISPs):
20 (1999)

Country code (Top level domain): .pt

See also 
 Media of Portugal:
 List of radio stations in Portugal
 Television in Portugal
 List of newspapers in Portugal

References